Award-Winning Drummer (also released as Max Roach) is an album by American jazz drummer Max Roach featuring a session recorded in 1958 and released on the Time label.

Reception

Allmusic reviewer Ron Wynn stated the group was "among the finest hard bop ensembles around".

Track listing
All compositions by Max Roach, except as indicated,
 "Tuba de Nod" - 3:56     
 "Milano" (John Lewis) - 5:09     
 "Variations on the Scene" (George Coleman) - 5:37     
 "Pies of Quincy" - 3:19     
 "Old Folks" (Dedette Lee Hill, Willard Robison) - 4:16     
 "Sadiga" (Coleman) - 6:31     
 "Gandolfo's Bounce" (Booker Little) - 5:38  
 "Milano" [alternate take] (Lewis) - 6:33 bonus track on iTunes release
 "Old Folks" [alternate take] (Hill, Robison) - 4:31 bonus track on iTunes release
 "Gandolfo's Bounce" [alternate take] (Little) - 6:12 bonus track on iTunes release

Personnel 
Max Roach - drums
Booker Little - trumpet
George Coleman - tenor saxophone
Ray Draper - tuba 
Art Davis - bass

References 

1959 albums
Albums produced by Bob Shad
Max Roach albums